The NT Indigenous Music Awards 2007 is the 4th annual National Indigenous Music Awards, established by MusicNT. The awards ceremony was held in August 2007.

Performers
The evening featured a number of special guests including Jessica Mauboy, Mandawuy Yunupingu from Yothu Yindi, Gurrumul Yunupingu from Saltwater Band and the Kenbi Dancers, who opened the event with traditional dancing.

Hall of Fame Inductee 
 Betty Fisher and Barry Benning

Outstanding Contribution to Music Awards 
 Paul "Djolpa" McKenzie and Steven Tranter

Awards
Act of the Year

Album of the Year

Song of the Year

People's Choice - "Song for Country"

Best New Talent

Artwork & Design of the Year

DVD/Film Clip of the Year

Traditional Music Award

School Band of the Year

References

2007 in Australian music
2007 music awards
National Indigenous Music Awards